Halkbank Ankara women's volleyball  is the women's volleyball department of Halkbank Ankara team based in Ankara, Turkey and sponsored by the state-owned Halkbank. It was founded on 21 July 1983 as Halkbank Spor Kulübü with blue, white and red colors. Halkbank Ankara plays in the Turkish Women's Volleyball League.

Team roster

Current
Team for the 2017–2018 season.

References

External links
 Turkish Volleyball Federation 

Women's volleyball teams in Turkey
Sports teams in Ankara
Volleyball clubs established in 1983
1983 establishments in Turkey